= Airolite =

- Production: 1923–1924
- Class: Motorcycle
- Engine: 110 cc Simplex two-stroke

The Airolite was an English motorcycle manufactured between 1923 and 1924, which featured a 110 cc Simplex two-stroke engine.
